The Professional Spring Football League (PSFL) was an outdoor american football minor league slated to begin in 1992.  The league had a preview show on SportsChannel America in late 1991/early 1992, laying out the ten teams that would play.  The league was founded by Vincent Sette, a computer sales executive.  Rex Lardner, a television executive, was the commissioner.

As far as sports leagues folding before they actually began to play their first season, this league probably got the closest to actually starting the season than any other example, as each team had players already in camp and practicing, and rosters cut down to 60 players, before the plug was pulled.  Some fairly high-profile coaches had been announced, and a number of current or future notable Arena Football and NFL players were in the teams' training camps, including mid-90s Miami Dolphins RB Bernie Parmalee, AFL QB Ben Bennett, AFL DS Durwood Roquemore, and AFL WR/DB Barry Wagner. Notre Dame QB Tony Rice, Timmy Smith RB – Washington Redskins (200+ yards in Super Bowl XXII) and many others that played professional football.

The 1992 PSFL Championship Game, "The Red, White And Blue Bowl", was to have been played at Robert F. Kennedy Memorial Stadium in Washington, D.C., on Sunday, July 5.

The folding of the league was announced on February 19, 1992, 10 days before the scheduled season opener. The league had over 7 million dollars in escrow from ticket sales as funds were not to be spent until the games were played and revenues were earned. This protected fans and sponsors from losses or failure, and ticketholder received full refunds. The PSFL tried to regroup for 1993 season, but again the start-up funding did not get secured and the league organization disbanded.

This league was the first sports LLC which has been the blueprint of several leagues since. (Most well-known is the WNBA).  Rather than the league being set up as a non-profit organization which technically exists for the benefit of its for-profit franchises, the PSFL was one single corporation (the "entity" model of sports league organization) with limited partners operating the teams and performing many of the functions usually performed by team owners in the traditional model of North American professional sport organization. This eliminated weak financial teams as well as the potential for collusion as all players were contracted from the PSFL and then assigned to teams. The teams shut down all on the same day as all invoiced expenses were paid by the league headquarters on a budget system. The start-up funding to get to the first games did not show up for various reasons.  It was responsible for many NFL changes in player relationships, stadium signage configurations, and marketing sponsorship innovations.

Two-point conversions were to be allowed and overtime was to be a modified sudden death, with each team being guaranteed a possession. The league did play a few exhibition games in Florida for the benefit of area police departments.

Teams

References

External links
Remember the PSFL

Defunct American football leagues in the United States
Sports leagues established in 1991
Organizations disestablished in 1993
1991 establishments in the United States
1993 disestablishments in the United States